Bruno Junqueira (born November 4, 1976) is a Brazilian race car driver who most recently competed in the IRL IndyCar Series. He is a former Formula 3000 champion and three-time runner-up in the Champ Car World Series.

Racing career

Early career
Junqueira started racing karts in Brazil and dominated Formula Three Sudamericana before moving to Formula 3000.  He tested for the Williams Formula One team for many years, and came close to landing a race drive in 2000, losing out to Jenson Button. He rebounded from this setback, winning that year's International Formula 3000 Championship.

Champ Car
In 2001 Junqueira joined the CART Championship Car series driving for Chip Ganassi Racing where he had immediate success, capturing a win in his 14th race and finished second in points with two wins the following year. In 2003 Ganassi left to the rival Indy Racing League and Junqueira joined Newman/Haas Racing, the top team remaining in what was now the Champ Car World Series. He captured series runner up honors in both 2003 and 2004, capturing two wins in each of those seasons. He also drove in the Indianapolis 500 four times for both Ganassi and Newman/Haas in one-off appearances.  In 2002, he qualified for the pole position, and he twice finished 5th in the race.

In the 2005 Indianapolis 500 Junqueira crashed head-on into the turn two wall after he passed backmarker A. J. Foyt IV but Foyt inattentively did not see Junqueira's car under him and struck his right-rear corner.  He suffered a concussion and a fractured vertebrae and missed the remainder of the 2005 Champ Car season.  Junqueira was the Champ Car points leader at the time, having won the second race of the year in Monterrey, Mexico.  Veteran Oriol Servia took his place and finished runner-up in the standings.

In 2006 he returned to the cockpit at Newman/Haas but for the first time in his career he did not win a race and only finished fifth in the championship while his teammate Sébastien Bourdais won his third straight title. He was replaced in the second Newman/Haas car in 2007 by rookie Graham Rahal and Junqueira signed to drive for Dale Coyne Racing as teammate to the inexperienced Katherine Legge. Junquiera finished seventh in the championship including three consecutive podium finishes late in the season.

IndyCar Series

Prior to the 2008 Indycar Series Season, Champ Car unified with the rival Indy Racing League. Junqueira drove the #18 car for the Coyne team's first season in the new series, alongside Brazilian rookie countryman Mario Moraes. His Indianapolis 500 was ruined by a mirror falling off, causing him to lose three laps during repairs. His season was not a great success, as he finished 20th overall with only two top ten finishes, both on road courses.

He was out of a drive for 2009. He made a deal with Conquest Racing for the Indianapolis 500 and qualified the car on Bump Day, but was asked to withdraw for the team's regular driver Alex Tagliani, who had failed to qualify his car due to a technical failure.

In 2011, driving for A. J. Foyt, he qualified his car for the 500 in nineteenth position, only to once again have to give up his chance to drive in the actual race. Foyt sold the unsponsored car's entry to Andretti Autosport, whose driver Ryan Hunter-Reay had been the final car bumped from the field. In 2012, he entered in for an injured Josef Newgarden at the first Grand Prix of Baltimore.

Racing record

Career summary

* Includes points scored by other Team Brazil drivers.

Complete International Formula 3000 results
(key) (Races in bold indicate pole position; races in italics indicate fastest lap.)

American open–wheel racing results
(key)

CART/Champ Car Series

 ^ New points system implemented in 2004.

IndyCar Series

 1 Races run on same day.
 2 Non-points-paying, exhibition race.

Indianapolis 500

Complete American Le Mans Series results

Complete A1 Grand Prix results
(key) (Races in bold indicate pole position) (Races in italics indicate fastest lap)

Complete Stock Car Brasil results

† Ineligible for championship points.

Complete WeatherTech SportsCar Championship results

† Did not complete sufficient laps in order to score points.

References

External links

Official Website
IndyCar Driver Page

1976 births
Living people
IndyCar Series drivers
Brazilian Champ Car drivers
Indianapolis 500 drivers
Indianapolis 500 polesitters
Formula 3 Sudamericana drivers
Brazilian racing drivers
Brazilian IndyCar Series drivers
Brazilian NASCAR drivers
Stock Car Brasil drivers
International Formula 3000 Champions
A1 Team Brazil drivers
International Formula 3000 drivers
Brazilian expatriate sportspeople in the United States
Sportspeople from Belo Horizonte
American Le Mans Series drivers
24 Hours of Daytona drivers
Rolex Sports Car Series drivers
Brazilian WeatherTech SportsCar Championship drivers
Chip Ganassi Racing drivers
Newman/Haas Racing drivers
Dale Coyne Racing drivers
Sarah Fisher Racing drivers
Draco Racing drivers
Multimatic Motorsports drivers
Super Nova Racing drivers
Conquest Racing drivers
A. J. Foyt Enterprises drivers
A1 Grand Prix drivers
Charouz Racing System drivers